Alba Molina Montoya (born 1978) is a Spanish-Romani singer who performs flamenco as well as hip hop and other forms of pop music. The daughter of the flamenco couple Lole Montoya and Manuel Molina, she collaborated with Las Niñas from the late 1990s and later with Spanish guitarist Ricardo Moreno producing Tucara (2009). More recently she has honoured her parents with the albums Alba canta a Lole y Manuel (2016) and Caminando con Manuel (2017).

Biography
Born in Seville on 26 November 1978, Alba Molina is the daughter of the flamenco performers Lole Montoya Rodríguez (born 1954) and Manuel Molina Jiménez (1948–2015) and the granddaughter of Antonia Rodriguez Moreno (1936–2018), a Romani flamenco singer and dancer known as La Negra.

Molina's first appearance was when as a 12-year-old she appeared as a model. Two years later, she won the title "Miss Elegancia" at the Jerez de la Frontera beauty contest. She went on to become a singer, releasing her first single Despacito in 1998. In addition to several singles, they released the albums Ojú (2003) and Savia Negra (2005). More recently she has honoured her parents with the albums Alba canta a Lole y Manuel (2016) and Caminando con Manuel (2017).

References

1978 births
People from Seville
Spanish Romani people
Flamenco singers
21st-century Spanish singers
Singers from Andalusia
Spanish women pop singers
Living people
21st-century Spanish women singers
Women in Latin music